Kalervo Juhani Kummola (born 21 November 1945) is a Finnish ice hockey executive, businessman, and politician. He co-founded the hockey club Kiekko-67 at age 21, was later marketing director for HC Turun Palloseura, and chief executive officer of the SM-liiga. Becoming a board member of the Finnish Ice Hockey Association in 1975, he was elected vice-president in 1990, and served as president from 1997 to 2016. He helped organize multiple World Championships hosted in Finland, was an International Ice Hockey Federation (IIHF) vice-president from 2003 to 2021, and chairman of the Finnish Olympic Committee from 2005 to 2016.

In business, Kummola co-founded the television production company VipVision, and was its chief executive officer from 1987 to 1999. He also served as chairman of the Tampere chamber of commerce, was the chief executive officer of the Tampere Hall entertainment and convention facility. In politics, he is a member of the National Coalition Party, was the member of the Parliament of Finland for Pirkanmaa from 1999 to 2003, served on the City Council of Tampere for 15 years, and was a member of the Pirkanmaa regional council, and served on the Finnish delegation to Nordic Council.

Kummola was inducted into the builder category of the Finnish Hockey Hall of Fame in 1996, was named an inductee into the builder category of the IIHF Hall of Fame in 2023. He was the first hockey person awarded the Grand Cross of Merit for Finnish Sports Culture and Sport, and was given the honorary title of Consul General by the president of Finland. Other honors given to Kummola include the Knight of the Order of the White Rose of Finland, the Order of the White Double Cross, and the Golden Cross of the Finnish Olympic Committee.

Early life
Kalervo Juhani Kummola was born on 21 November 1945, in Raisio, Finland, to parents Eino Viljam Kummola and Aili Johanna Lehto. He grew up in a Pentecostal family, and had one brother and two sisters. He played ice hockey as a youth, and described himself as a troublemaker in elementary school. From age 10 onward, he went to a Christian summer camp, and accompanied his father building houses.

At age 13, Kummola moved with his family to Australia, where he lived for three years and learned to speak English. He played football and baseball at school, and graduated from Keira Boys' High School in North Wollongong, New South Wales, in 1962.

Kummola returned to Finland with his family at age 16, and attended the Reserve Officer School to become a second lieutenant in the Finnish Defence Forces. When his family moved to Australia again, he remained in Finland since he could have been drafted into service for Australia during the Vietnam War. He later reached the rank of major in the reserves of the Finnish Defence Forces.

Ice hockey career
Kummola played hockey as goaltender in for several lower-division teams in Turku, and established a team for the Pentecostal church. After retiring from playing, he co-founded the  ice hockey and roller in-line hockey club. He was elected president of Kiekko-67 at age 23, becoming the youngest ice hockey club president in Finland. He later worked as the marketing director for HC Turun Palloseura from 1971 to 1975, then relocated to Tampere when he became chief executive officer of the newly-established professional SM-liiga in 1975. He served in the position for 12 years until 1987.

Finnish Ice Hockey Association

Kummola became a board member of the Finnish Ice Hockey Association in 1975, was elected its vice-president in 1990, and served as its president from 1997 to 2016. He was one of the founding members of the Finnish Hockey Hall of Fame in 1979, sat on its board of directors for 33 years, and has been chairman of the inductee selection committee since 1986.

During his tenure with the association, he served as secretary general of the 1982 Ice Hockey World Championships held in Helsinki and Tampere; and was on the organizing committees of multiple Ice Hockey World Championships and IIHF World Junior Championship hosted in Finland. He enacted a ban on tobacco and alcohol for players and officials shall be prohibited, with the reasoning that it upheld ethics in sport in addition to avoiding health hazards.

One of Kummola's concerns as president was reducing the number of players leaving the country for Sweden, and felt it more of a priority than winning a World Championship. In the latter part of his presidency, he worked on preparations for the 2022 IIHF World Championship hosted in Tampere, which had last hosted the World Championships in 1965. Kummola was a driving force behind construction of the Nokia Arena in Tampere, which took 15 years of planning to build the venue.

International Ice Hockey Federation

Kummola was named the Finnish delegate to the International Ice Hockey Federation (IIHF) in 1976, and the IIHF council beginning in 1998. From 1998 to 2003, he was chairman of the IIHF committees for championship host bids, championship structure, and discipline.

The IIHF elected Kummola a vice-president in 2003. In 2005, he helped the IIHF reach an agreement with the National Hockey League to govern the movement of professional players from Europe to North America. He was chairman of the IIHF committees for coaching and sport from 2003 to 2008, and was president of the international Champions Hockey League for the 2008–09 season. Other work included chairman of the facilities and environment committee from 2008 to 2012, chairman of the co-ordination committee from 2013 to 2016, and chairman of the event and evaluation committee from 2016 to 2020.

Kummola retired as vice-president in 2021, serving his whole tenure under president René Fasel, who also retired in 2021. Kummola remained involved with the IIHF, named to the hall of fame and historical working group from 2021 to 2026.

Finnish national sports

Kummola was a member of the board of directors for the Finnish Olympic Committee from 1993 to 2005, then served as its chairman from 2005 to 2016. He was a member of the board of directors for the Pajulahti Sports Institute from 1994 to 2006, then served as its chairman from 2006 to 2014. He also served as chairman of the organizing committee for the Finnish Athletics Championships in 1996.

Business career
Kummola worked in administration for Unilever Finland from 1966 to 1973, then was the  marketing manager for FC Inter Turku from 1973 to 1975. He co-founded the television production company  in 1987, and served as its chief executive officer from 1987 to 1999.

During his tenure at VipVision, he was inspired to introduce karaoke to Finland after visiting his brother. Kummola thought it would be a craze for a few years, but it remained popular to his surprise.

Kummola served as chairman of the Tampere chamber of commerce from 1993 to 2017, was chairman of the Vierumäki Country Club from 2006 to 2017, and served as vice-chairman of the School of Art and Communication at the Tampere University of Applied Sciences. From 2004 to 2011, he was the chief executive officer of the entertainment and convention facility, Tampere Hall. He helped organize European Union meetings at the hall, and envisioned a multi-purpose centre expansion next to the Sorsapuisto for major events including World Championships.

Kummola later served as chairman of the Tampere Group, which oversees 40 local companies. In a 2020 magazine interview, Kummola stated his desire to be involved in "projects that leave something visible to the next generations".

Political career

Kummola served as chairman of the Pirkanmaa electoral district of the National Coalition Party, and was elected the district's deputy commissioner in advance of the 1980 Finnish municipal elections. He served on the City Council of Tampere from 1989 until 2004, and was its vice-chairman from 1997 to 1999. He also served on the Tampere City Board from 1989 to 1997; was a member of the Pirkanmaa Council from 1997 to 2001, and its chairman from 2001 to 2005.

In the 1999 Finnish parliamentary election, Kummola was elected to the Parliament of Finland as the National Coalition Party candidate for Pirkanmaa, serving from 24 March 1999, until 18 March 2003. In parliament, he served on committees for national defense, economics, and environmental audits. He also served on the Finnish delegation to Nordic Council in 1999, and was an auditor of the Bank of Finland from 2000 to 2002. He declined candidacy in the 2003 election, as he was not interested in serving as opposition to the government.

Kummola contested the National Coalition Party nomination for mayor of Tampere in the 2021 Finnish municipal elections. He sought to improve elderly care, medical treatments, and the situation for marginalized youth. Anna-Kaisa Ikonen won the party's nomination and was later elected mayor.

Personal life
Kummola married Tuula Annikki Kuusela in 1969, and has two daughters. The couple met on a blind date in 1966, and reside in Tampere as of 2015. He became independently wealthy due to his success in television.

In recreational time, Kummola partakes in birdwatching and fishing, and listens to the Christian Radio Dei. He owns an island in the Kustavi-Uusikaupunki area, and claims to have spotted more than 50 bird species locally. He is interested in environmental issues, nature conservation, and preserving the Baltic Sea.

In 1999, Kummola was a rallying participant involved in a crash with a car driven by Teemu Selänne, which put Kummola into a wheelchair for four months.

Honors and legacy

Kummola has received multiple honors for his work in hockey. He was inducted into the builder category of the Finnish Hockey Hall of Fame in 1996, and inducted into the Hall of Fame for HC Turun Palloseura in 2015. He was also named an honorary chairman of the Finnish Ice Hockey Association. He was named an inductee into the builder category of the IIHF Hall of Fame in 2023, with the ceremony to be held prior to the medal games of the 2023 IIHF World Championship in Tampere.

In June 2016, the president of Finland awarded Kummola the honorary  to Kummola. The Tampere Chamber of Commerce named Kummola the economic influencer of the year for 2017.

Other honors given to Kummola include the Knight of the Order of the White Rose of Finland, the Order of the White Double Cross from Slovakia, the Golden Cross of the Finnish Olympic Committee, the Grand Cross of Merit, the Golden Medal of Merit of the City of Tampere, and the Golden Order of Merit of the National Coalition Party.

Kummola is known by the nickname "Rautakansleri" ("Iron Chancellor"), which was also the title of his biography co-authored with Jari Korkki in 2020. Kummola established the Kalervo Kummola Fund, to benefit low-income youth playing hockey in Finland. When his tenure ended as vice-president of the IIHF, the Finnish Broadcasting Company felt that Finland would lose influence in international hockey without his presence.

References

External links
 

1945 births
Living people
20th-century Finnish businesspeople
21st-century Finnish businesspeople
Champions Hockey League (2008–09)
Chief executives in the media industry
Chief executives in the sports industry
FC Inter Turku
Finnish chief executives
Finnish ice hockey administrators
Finnish ice hockey coaches
Finnish ice hockey goaltenders
Finnish military personnel
Finnish Pentecostals
Finnish sportsperson-politicians
Finnish television people
HC TPS
IIHF Hall of Fame inductees
International Ice Hockey Federation executives
Liiga
Members of the Parliament of Finland (1999–2003)
National Coalition Party politicians
Order of the White Rose of Finland
People from Raisio
Politicians from Tampere
Unilever people